Binibining Pilipinas 2008 was the 45th edition of Binibining Pilipinas. It took place at the Smart Araneta Coliseum in Quezon City, Metro Manila, Philippines on March 8, 2008.

At the end of the event, Anna Teresa Licaros crowned Jennifer Barrientos as Binibining Pilipinas Universe 2008, Margaret Wilson crowned Janina San Miguel as Binibining Pilipinas World 2008, and Nadia Lee Cien Shami crowned Patricia Fernandez as Binibining Pilipinas International 2008. Danielle Castaño was named First Runner-Up and Elizabeth Jacqueline Nacuspag was named 2nd Runner-Up.

Due to personal reasons including the death of her grandfather, Janina San Miguel resigned her title as Binibining Pilipinas World 2008 in September 2008. The title was automatically transferred to the first runner-up, Danielle Castaño who went on to represent the Philippines at the Miss World 2008 pageant.

Results
Color keys
  The contestant was a Semi-Finalist in an International pageant.
  The contestant was not able to compete in an International pageant.
  The contestant did not place.

Special Awards

Judges 
Joseph Bernardo – Philippine Ambassador to Spain
Kristie Kenney – Ambassador Extraordinary and Plenipotentiary Embassy of the United States
Makoto Katsura – Ambassador Extraordinary and Plenipotentiary Embassy of Japan
Feliciano Belmonte, Jr. – Quezon City mayor
Vijay Mallya – Chairman United Breweries Group / Kingfisher Airlines
Jean Moueix – Chateau Petrus
Vivienne Tan – Founder, Entrepreneurs School of Asia
Oscar S. Salvacion – President Sofitel Philippine Plaza
Marian Rivera – Actress, Ramp and Commercial Model
Dennis Trillo – Multi-awarded Matinee Idol and Commercial Model
Chris Tiu – TV Host

Contestants
24 contestants competed for the three titles.

Notes

Post-pageant Notes 
 Jennifer Barrientos competed at Miss Universe 2008 in Nha Trang, Vietnam but was unplaced. Danielle Castaño was also unplaced when she competed at Miss World 2008 in Johannesburg. On the other hand, Patricia Fernandez was one of the twelve semifinalists when she competed at Miss International 2008 in Macau.
 Both Karla Henry and Maria Kristelle Lazaro competed at Miss Philippines Earth 2008. Lazaro was crowned Miss Philippines Fire 2008, and while Henry won the Miss Philippines Earth 2008 title. Henry then competed Miss Earth 2008 in Angeles City and won. She was also won the Miss Photogenic Award and the Miss Earth Designers Award.

References

External links
 Official Binibining Pilipinas website

2008
2008 in the Philippines
2008 beauty pageants